The Targhee is a breed of domestic sheep developed in early 20th century by the USDA's Agricultural Research Service. Targhee sheep are a dual-purpose breed, with heavy, medium quality wool and good meat production characteristics. They are hardy, and are especially suited to the ranges of the West where they were developed. Targhee are especially popular in Montana, Wyoming and South Dakota, where their ¾ fine wool and ¼ long wool breeding is favored by western ranchers.  This breed is raised primarily for wool.

Characteristics

Mature body weight in the rams is 200 lb (90 kg) to 300 lb (135 kg), with the ewes weighing slightly less at 125 lb (56 kg) to 200 lb (90 kg). Each ewe will average a 10 lb (4.5 kg) to 14 lb (6.3 kg) fleece; it has a fibre diameter of 21 to 25 micrometers and a spinning count of 64 to 58. The staple length of the fleece will be 3 inches (7.5 cm) to 5 inches (11 cm) with a yield of 50% to 55%.

History
Targhee sheep were named after the Targhee National Forest, which surrounds the U.S. Sheep Experiment Station in Idaho. Their ancestors were Rambouillet, Corriedale, and Lincoln sheep. Development of this breed for the Western ranges of the U.S. began as early as 1900. The flock book was closed in 1966, meaning that only the offspring of registered Targhees could be registered).

References

External links 
 U.S. Targhee Sheep Association

Sheep breeds
Sheep breeds originating in the United States